Old Shandon Historic District is a national historic district located at Columbia, South Carolina.  The district encompasses 42 contributing buildings in a planned middle class residential development. They were built between the 1890s and 1950s, and the district includes examples of Queen Anne, Colonial Revival, Neoclassical Revival, and Craftsman/Bungalow style architecture.  The district also includes the Shandon Baptist Church (Bethel A.M.E. Church) and Maple Street Southern Methodist Church.

It was added to the National Register of Historic Places in 2003.

References

Historic districts on the National Register of Historic Places in South Carolina
Houses on the National Register of Historic Places in South Carolina
Queen Anne architecture in South Carolina
Colonial Revival architecture in South Carolina
Neoclassical architecture in South Carolina
Houses in Columbia, South Carolina
National Register of Historic Places in Columbia, South Carolina